GJ 1005 is a system of two red dwarfs, located in constellation Cetus at 19.6 light-years from Earth. The primary star is a M4V class star while the secondary is a class M7V.

The system was observed with the Hubble Space Telescope in the 1990s with its Fine Guidance Sensor. This data helped determine the mass of each of the components of L722-22/ LHS 1047 / GJ 1005.

References

Cetus (constellation)
Binary stars
M-type main-sequence stars
1005
001242
J00152799-1608008